David Haysom (1917–1979) was a South African flying ace of World War II, credited with 6 'kills'.

Haysome was born in Durban in 1917 and attended Durban High School before going onto Natal University College, obtaining a BSc. He intended to study medicine at Edinburgh University but abandoned his studies to join the RAF on a short service commission in 1937.

He joined 79 Squadron in 1938, flying Hurricanes.

He commanded the squadron from June to September 1941 before being posted to the Middle East, joining 260 Squadron in July 1942. He was appointed Acting Wing Commander and posted as Wing Leader of 239 Wing three days after joining 260 Squadron.

He was released from the RAF as a Group Captain in 1946. He died in 1979

References

South African World War II flying aces
1917 births
1979 deaths
South African military personnel of World War II
Recipients of the Distinguished Flying Cross (United Kingdom)
Companions of the Distinguished Service Order